NGC 7064 is a nearby edge-on barred spiral galaxy located about 35 million light-years away in the constellation of Indus. NGC 7064 has an estimated diameter of 51,000 light-years. NGC 7064 was discovered by astronomer John Herschel on July 8, 1834.

See also 
 NGC 4013
 List of NGC objects (7001–7840)

References

External links 

Barred spiral galaxies
Indus (constellation)
7064
66836
Astronomical objects discovered in 1834